Hamilton George Keene (15 November 1896, in Hampstead – 4 October 1975, in Chelsea). He was a British stage and film actor. He appeared in more than thirty British films, originally in more prominent roles during the early 1930s and later in smaller, often uncredited parts. They included: The Mutiny of the Elsinore (1937 film); It's Not Cricket; Burnt Evidence; and nearly thirty others.

Selected filmography
 Lost Patrol (1929)
 The Middle Watch (1930)
 Suspense (1930)
 The New Hotel (1932)
 Illegal (1932)
 Leave It to Blanche (1934)
 The Blue Squadron (1934)
 The Office Wife (1934)
 Little Stranger (1934)
 The Mutiny of the Elsinore (1937)
 Mountains O'Mourne (1938)
 The Body Vanished (1939)
 The Briggs Family (1940)
 Contraband (1940)
 I'll Turn to You (1946)
 The Trial of Madame X (1948)
 It's Not Cricket (1949)
 The Second Mate (1950)
 Night and the City (1950)
 Tread Softly (1952)
 Innocents in Paris (1953)
 The Devil's Jest (1954)
 Burnt Evidence (1954)
 Forbidden Cargo (1954)

References

Bibliography
 Paul M. Edwards. World War I on Film: English Language Releases through 2014. McFarland, 2016.

External links

1896 births
Year of death unknown
British male stage actors
British male film actors
Male actors from London